Babette Preußler (born 28 September 1968 in Berlin, Germany) is a former East German pair skater.  With partner Torsten Ohlow, she won the bronze medal at the 1983 East German Figure Skating Championships.  They went on to finish sixth at that year's European Figure Skating Championships and twelfth at the World Figure Skating Championships.

The next year, Preußler teamed with Tobias Schröter to win another bronze medal at the East German Championships.  They finished eleventh at the 1984 Winter Olympics, sixth at the European Championships, and ninth at the World Championships.

Results

With Schröter

With Ohlow

References
 Sports-Reference.com profile

1968 births
German female pair skaters
Figure skaters at the 1984 Winter Olympics
Figure skaters from Berlin
Olympic figure skaters of East Germany
Living people
World Junior Figure Skating Championships medalists